The Zaharia family was an Albanian noble family of the 14th and 15th centuries.

History

Nicholas Zakarija
The Zaharia family is mentioned for the first time in the 14th century. A certain Nicholas Zakarija is first mentioned in 1385 as a Balšić family commander and governor of Budva in 1363. After more than twenty years of loyalty, Nicholas Zakarija revolted in 1386 and became ruler of Budva. However, by 1389 Đurađ II Balšić had recaptured the city.

The name of Nicholas Zaharia appears in the form of Nikola Sakat in many original Venetian and Ragusan documents (as governor of Budva in 1383, influential person in Zeta in 1386 and lord of Dagnum during a period of cooperation with Balšić family). That is a basis for some concluding that that Nicholas Zaharia and Nikola Sakat are the same person, who is related to Koja Zaharia.

Komnen Arianiti of Arianiti family married the daughter of Nicholas Zaharia Sakati, ruler of Budva. They had three sons (Gjergj, Muzaka, and Vladan), and one daughter who married Pal Dukagjini.

Koja Zaharia
In 1396, due to a favorable political situation, Koja Zaharija captured the castle of Dagnum and declared himself a vassal of the Ottomans. In 1412 or at the beginning of 1413, in his second marriage, Balša III married Bolja, a daughter of Koja Zaharia. In 1415 their only son and the only male descendant of the Balša family died. Koja maintained the control of the region until his death.

Lekë Zaharia
Upon the death of Koja Zaharija, control of the region was passed to his only son, Lekë Zaharia. According to Marin Barleti, in 1445, during the wedding ceremony of Skanderbeg's sister Mamica Kastrioti, Lekë Zaharia had a dispute with Lekë Dukagjini. The reason of this dispute was a woman named Irene Dushmani, the heir of Dushmani family. She seemed to prefer Zaharia, while this was not accepted by Dukagjini. A skirmish happened and Lekë Dukagjini remained wounded, saved only by the intervention of Vrana Konti. Two years later, in 1447, Lekë Zaharia was killed in an ambush and Lekë Dukagjini was accused of this murder.

Original Venetian documents show that this murder happened in 1444. According to Venetian chronicler Stefano Magno, it was Nicholas Dukagjin, Zaharia's vassal, who killed Lekë Zaharia in battle, not Lekë Dukagjin, as stated by Marin Barleti. Stefano Magno also stated that, before he died, Lekë Zaharia expressed the wish that his properties should be handed over to Venetian Republic.

Bozha Zaharia
Bozha Zaharia, an Albanian nobleman who also was member of Zaharia family, died in the fire which devastated Venetian Scutari in October 1448.

After the extinction of the family
Having left no heirs, the fortress of Dagnum was claimed by Skanderbeg in the name of League of Lezhë, in which Lekë Zaharia had been a participant. However, his mother surrendered the castle to the Venice Republic. This events triggered the two-year-long Albanian–Venetian War (1447–1448). In the end the castle of Dagnum remained in Venetian hands toward an annual tribute to Skanderbeg.

Religious affiliation
According to Eqrem Vlora, some members of the Zaharia family were initially Eastern Orthodox Christians, only converting to Roman Catholicism in 1414, after which they disappeared from history.

Family tree

See also
 Pjetër Zakaria (13??–1414), member of the family, bishop of the Roman Catholic Diocese of Sapë and of Dagnum
 Elia, Crown Princess of Albania (née Zaharia in 1983), wife of Leka, Crown Prince of Albania

References

Bibliography

 Text not available online as of August 2021.

 
Medieval Montenegro
15th-century Albanian people
14th-century Albanian people
League of Lezhë